Cetoscarus bicolor, also known as the bicolour parrotfish or bumphead parrotfish, is a species of fish belonging to the family Scaridae. It is found only in the Red Sea.

Distribution and habitat 
While this species is restricted to the Red Sea, it is related to the spotted parrotfish (Cetoscarus ocellatus), which is also sometimes called the bicolour parrotfish. These species were formally classified as one, the only in the genus Cetoscarus, but there are major molecular and morphological differences between the two. C. bicolor is associated with coral reefs. Small juveniles are usually found among dense coral and in algae-rich habitats.

Description 
As in many of its relatives, it is a sequential hermaphrodite, starting as female (known as the initial phase) and then changing to male (the terminal phase). The initial phase is dark brown with a large cream patch on the upper part of the body. The terminal phase is very colourful, overall green with pink spotting to the body and edging to the fins. Juveniles are white with a black spot on the dorsal fin and an orange band through the eye.

Behaviour 
As in other parrotfish species, males are territorial. During its lifetime, this fish changes sex twice and very large females change sex to become brightly coloured males. This parrotfish mainly feeds on algae.

References

External links 
 

bicolor
Fish of the Red Sea
Taxa named by Eduard Rüppell
bicolour parrotfish